David E. Finley (February 28, 1861 – January 26, 1917) was a United States representative from South Carolina. He was born in Trenton, Arkansas. He attended the public schools of Rock Hill, South Carolina, and Ebenezer, South Carolina and was graduated from the law department of South Carolina College (now the University of South Carolina) at Columbia, South Carolina, in 1885. He was admitted to the bar in 1886 and commenced practice in York, South Carolina.

Finley was member of the South Carolina House of Representatives 1890–1891. He also served in the South Carolina Senate 1892–1896. He served as a trustee of the University of South Carolina 1890–1896. He was elected as a Democrat to the Fifty-sixth and to the eight succeeding Congresses and served from March 4, 1899, until his death. Prior to dying, he had been reelected to the Sixty-fifth Congress. He died in Charlotte, North Carolina, on January 26, 1917, and was buried in Rose Hill Cemetery, York, South Carolina.

Finley's son, David E. Finley, Jr., a prominent cultural leader in the United States in the 20th century, served as the first director of the National Gallery of Art and the founding chairman of the National Trust for Historic Preservation.

See also
List of United States Congress members who died in office (1900–49)

References

External links
 
 David E. Finley, late a representative from South Carolina, Memorial addresses delivered in the House of Representatives and Senate frontispiece 1917

1861 births
1917 deaths
People from Phillips County, Arkansas
Democratic Party South Carolina state senators
Democratic Party members of the South Carolina House of Representatives
Democratic Party members of the United States House of Representatives from South Carolina
19th-century American politicians